dDub is a band from New Zealand. Their style is rock-roots, reggae, soul-ska, and dub. They have played numerous outdoor festivals in New Zealand, including Splore, Queenstown Winter Festival, Soundsplash and Rhythm & Vines.

Band members

David Hodkinson – Bass
Chris Grant – Drums/Backing Vocals
Anthony Hunt – Keyboards
Andrew Hall – Sax//Backing Vocals
 Neil Cording – Trumpet 
 Mike Young – Trombone 
 Dixon Nacey – Guitar

Former members
Derek Wayne (D. W.) Browne – Lead Vocals/Guitar
 Steve Fulford – Guitar/Backing Vocals
 Matt Shanks – Bass/Backing Vocals
Tala Ofamooni – Drums
Duncan Taylor – Trombone
Ben Campbell – Sax/Flute
Tim Atkinson – Sax
 Finn Scoles – trumpet
 Jono Tan – trombone

Discography

dDub has released one tour EP, two studio albums, and several singles, including "The Closer You Get, The Bigger I Look," a track written specifically for a project to raise awareness and understanding of dyslexia, released to celebrate Dyslexia Action Week 2009. Their songs have appeared on compilation albums in New Zealand as well. They are currently working on a third studio album, recently releasing the new single, "We Are The Ones" in December 2009.

Death of Derek Browne
The lead vocalist Derek Browne died on 23 April 2019 after a six-month battle with prostate cancer. Prior to the diagnosis he had been able to climb trees for his work as an arborist. By the time he visited the doctor, he had fully developed stage 4 of the tumor. He was given the choice to undergo chemotherapy or to simply wait until his passing.
2003: Limited Edition Winter Tour EP
2006: Awake At Dawn
2008: Medicine Man
2012: Natural Selection

Notes and references

External links
 Official website
 Official Facebook website
 Official Myspace website
 Vunderchick Records management
 dDub on Last.fm

New Zealand dub musical groups
Vunderchick Records artists